Ferris Wheel of Berlin  may refer to:
Great Berlin Wheel, proposed for a site near Berlin Zoological Garden, but never built
Spreepark Ferris wheel, at the now defunct Spreepark